Walter McCoy may refer to:

Walter I. McCoy (1859–1933), American Democratic Party politician from New Jersey
Walter R. McCoy (1880–1952), advocate of the hobby of stamp collecting
Walter McCoy (athlete) (born 1958), American former sprinter
Walter McCoy (baseball) (1923–2015), Negro leagues and Minor League Baseball pitcher